The 1950 Nobel Prize in Literature was awarded the British philosopher Bertrand Russell (1872–1970) "in recognition of his varied and significant writings in which he champions humanitarian ideals and freedom of thought." He is the fourth philosopher to become a recipient of the prize after the French analytic-continental philosopher Henri Bergson in 1927, and was followed by the French-Algerian existentialist Albert Camus in 1957. He is also the fifth British author to be awarded.

Laureate

Bertrand Russell made his first pioneering contributions within the branch of philosophy that deals with logic and mathematics. But his influence eventually spread across much more ground. His work is known for its lightheartedness and humor, and it has helped a large audience of readers learn about science and philosophy. His writings cover a variety of subjects, including social and moral challenges, and his opinions were frequently divisive. Russell was a fierce champion of the right to free speech and thinking as well as a strong supporter of reason and humanism. His most famous philosophical works include Principia Mathematica (1910–1913), The Problems of Philosophy (1912), Why I Am Not a Christian (1927), Power: A New Social Analysis (1938), and A History of Western Philosophy (1945).

Deliberations

Nominations
Russell had not been nominated for the prize before 1950, making it one of the rare occasions when an author have been awarded the Nobel Prize in Literature the same year they were first nominated. He was only nominated once by nominator Eugen Tigerstedt (1907–1979), professor of Swedish literature at the University of Helsinki. 

In total, the Nobel committee received 79 nominations for 54 individuals. Pär Lagerkvist (awarded in 1951) received seven nominations and was named a favorite following the publication of his novel Barabbas, while Winston Churchill (awarded in 1953) received six nominations. 20 of the nominees were nominated first-time such as Simon Vestdijk, Graham Greene, Mika Waltari, Martin Buber, Robert Frost, Karl Jaspers, Alfred Noyes, John Dewey, Hermann Broch, and Robert Graves. Four of the nominees were women namely Karen Blixen, Marie Under, Gertrud von Le Fort, and Henriette Roland Holst. The American author William Faulkner was nominated in 1950 and was awarded for last year.

The authors Edgar Rice Burroughs, Augusto d'Halmar, Albert Ehrenstein, John Gould Fletcher, Nicolai Hartmann, George Cecil Ives, Alfred Korzybski, Sigizmund Krzhizhanovsky, Elisabeth Langgässer, Marcel Mauss, Edna St. Vincent Millay, Emmanuel Mounier, Cesare Pavese, Ernest Poole, Hilda D. Oakeley, George Orwell, Alykul Osmonov, Rafael Sabatini, Agnes Smedley, Olaf Stapledon, Xavier Villaurrutia, and Yi Kwang-su (nominated posthumously in 1970) died in 1950 without having been nominated.

Award Ceremony
During the award ceremony held at Stockholm City Hall on 10 December 1966, Anders Österling of the Swedish Academy, said:

Nobel lecture
Russell delivered a Nobel lecture entitled "What Desires Are Politically Important?" at the Swedish Academy on 11 December 1950. The lecture addresses the political ramifications of desires that are considered infinite in their ability to be satisfied but not necessary for immediate human survival. He highly stressed the importance of neutral and socially beneficial venues for the venting of passions and suggests the cultivation of intelligence as the best antidote for social strife.

References

External links
Award Ceremony speech
The Nobel Prize Award Ceremony 1950 video nobelprize.org

1950
Bertrand Russell